|}

The Juvenile Stakes (registered as the Golden Fleece Stakes) is a Group 2 flat horse race in Ireland open to two-year-old thoroughbreds. It is run over a distance of 1 mile (1,609 metres) at Leopardstown in September.

History
The event was first named the Golden Fleece Stakes after Golden Fleece, the Irish-trained winner of The Derby in 1982. It was established in 2007, and was originally contested over 7 furlongs. It initially held Listed status, and took place in late June or early July.

The race was switched to September and extended to a mile in 2012. From this point it was billed as a trial for the Breeders' Cup Juvenile Turf, and known as the Breeders' Cup Juvenile Turf Trial Stakes. It was promoted to Group 3 level in 2013. In 2014 it was renamed the Juvenile Turf Stakes and became part of the Irish Champions Weekend fixture. The word "Turf" was dropped from the title in 2015.

Records

Leading jockey (5 wins):
 Joseph O'Brien – Tenth Star (2011), Battle of Marengo (2012), Australia (2013), John F Kennedy (2014), Johannes Vermeer (2015)

Leading trainer (9 wins):
 Aidan O'Brien – Zoffany (2010), Tenth Star (2011), Battle of Marengo (2012), Australia (2013), John F Kennedy (2014), Johannes Vermeer (2015), Nelson (2017), Mogul (2019), Auguste Rodin (2022)

Winners

 The 2009 running took place at Fairyhouse.

See also
 Horse racing in Ireland
 List of Irish flat horse races

References

 Racing Post:

 horseracingintfed.com – International Federation of Horseracing Authorities – Juvenile Stakes (2018).
 pedigreequery.com – Golden Fleece Stakes – Leopardstown.
 

Flat horse races for two-year-olds
Leopardstown Racecourse
Flat races in Ireland
2007 establishments in Ireland
Recurring sporting events established in 2007
Breeders' Cup Challenge series